= Navid Jamshidi =

Iranian journalist

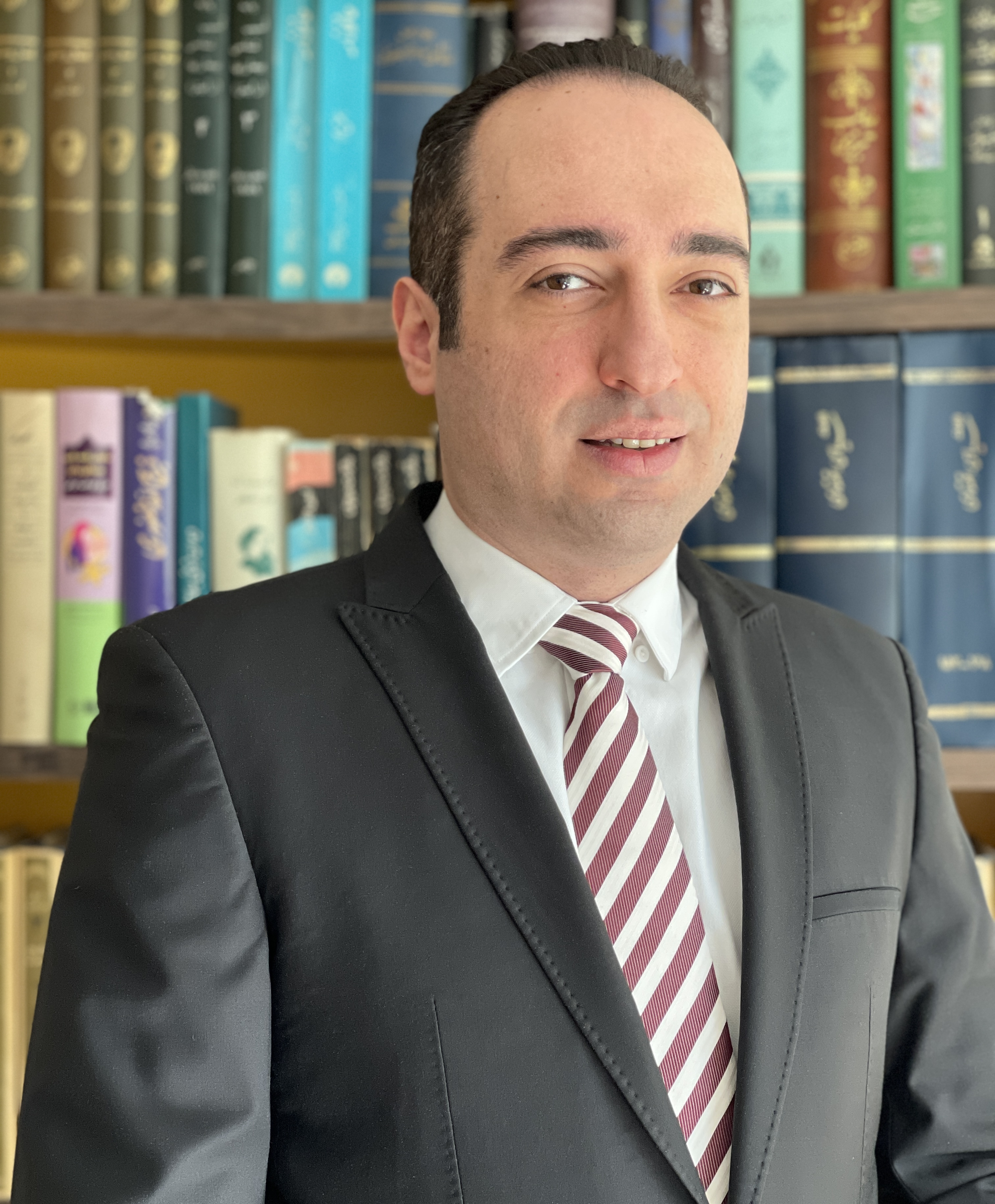
- Jamshidi in 2021
- Born: October 26, 1983 (age 42); Tehran, Iran
- Occupation: Journalist

Navid Jamshidi (Persian: نوید جمشیدی; born October 26, 1983, in Tehran) is an Iranian journalist.

He has been arrested several times by security agencies due to his journalistic activities and his role as editor-in-chief of the Asia newspaper. Jamshidi’s arrests have mainly been related to reports and articles published in this newspaper, and the charges brought against him have been connected to issues of freedom of expression and the press in Iran. His cases have drawn reactions from the media and have sparked responses from human rights organizations and advocacy groups.

== Awards ==
- Prize of Membership in the Association of Journalists.
- Journalism Prize from NorthWest International University.
